The 1988–89 Divizia B was the 49th season of the second tier of the Romanian football league system.

The format has been maintained to three series, each of them having 18 teams. At the end of the season the winners of the series promoted to Divizia A and the last four places from each series relegated to Divizia C.

Team changes

To Divizia B
Promoted from Divizia C
 Explorări Câmpulung Moldovenesc
 Aripile Victoria Bacău
 Metalul Mangalia
 Dunărea Călărași
 Metalul Mija
 Dacia Pitești
 Minerul Motru
 CFR Timișoara
 Minerul Cavnic
 Unirea Alba Iulia
 Avântul Reghin
 Poiana Câmpina

Relegated from Divizia A
 Politehnica Timișoara
 Petrolul Ploiești
 CSM Suceava

From Divizia B
Relegated to Divizia C
 Inter Vaslui
 Autobuzul București
 Sticla Arieșul Turda
 Unirea Slobozia
 Mecanică Fină București
 CIL Sighetu Marmației
 Olimpia Râmnicu Sărat
 Metalul București
 Minerul Baia Sprie
 Petrolul Ianca
 Progresul Vulcan București
 Victoria Carei

Promoted to Divizia A
 FC Constanța
 Inter Sibiu
 Bihor Oradea

Renamed teams
Aripile Victoria Bacău was renamed as Aripile Bacău.

Delta Dinamo Tulcea was renamed as Delta Tulcea.

Gloria Pandurii was renamed as Pandurii Târgu Jiu.

Prahova CSU Ploiești was renamed as Prahova Ploiești.

Sportul Muncitoresc Caracal was renamed as FCM Caracal.

Sportul Muncitoresc Slatina was renamed as Metalurgistul Slatina.

League tables

Serie I

Serie II

Serie III

See also 
 1988–89 Divizia A

References

Liga II seasons
Romania
2